Uncle is a South Korean television series starring Oh Jung-se, Jeon Hye-jin, Lee Kyung-hoon, Park Sun-young, Lee Sang-woo and Lee Si-won. Based on the British sitcom of the same name, it is about an uncle who struggles to protect his nephew amid blatant discrimination. It aired on TV Chosun from December 11, 2021 to January 30, 2022.

Synopsis
It tells the story of an uncle who takes care of his nephew, an elementary school student who has anxiety disorder and obsessive–compulsive disorder, due to his sister's divorce.

Cast

Main
 Oh Jung-se as Wang Jun-hyeok, an out-of-work musician who stands on the brink of betrayal and fraud.
 Jeon Hye-jin as Wang Jun-hee, Jun-hyeok's older sister who has chosen to divorce after twelve years of marriage to protect her child from domestic violence.
  as Min Ji-hoo, Jun-hee's son and Jun-hyeok's nephew.
 Jung Su-bin as adult Min Ji-hoo
 Park Sun-young as Park Hye-ryung, the president of Royal Momvely, a cafe for mothers in the Royal State, and the neighborhood's "queen bee".
 Lee Sang-woo as Joo Kyung-il, a father who raises his daughter alone after the death of his wife.
 Lee Si-won as Song Hwa-eum, an elementary school teacher.

Supporting

Royal Momvely
 Hwang Woo-seul-hye as Kim Yu-ra, the face manager of Royal Momvely and Hye-ryung's right-hand woman.
 Kim Ha-yeon  as Ye So-dam, Yu-ra's daughter.
 Jung Soo-young as Cheon Da-jeong, a gold member of Royal Momvely.
 Park Se-chan as Park Si-wan, Da-jeong's son.
 Song Ah-kyung as Oh Hyeon-joo, a gold member of Royal Momvely.
 Lee Na-eun as Jung Soo-jin, a gold member of Royal Momvely.

People around Ji-hoo
 Song Ok-sook as Shin Hwa-ja, Ji-hoo's grandmother who is the chairman of the third leading financial firm.
 Yoon Hee-seok as Min Kyung-soo, Jun-hee's immature ex-husband who plans various plots with his mother Hwa-ja to take custody of his son Ji-hoo.
 Bae Geu-rin as Kim Young-ah, Kyung-soo's lover.

Hot Bar
 Ahn Suk-hwan as Jang Ik, former drummer of visual rock band Troika and the president of Hot Bar, a safe haven for musicians.
 Jang Hee-ryung as Jang Yeon-joo, Jang Ik's daughter who is a guitarist.
 Choi Seung-yoon as Son Ju-no, Yeon-joo's new boyfriend who is a bassist.

Others
 Choi Gyu-ri as Shin Chae-young, Hye-ryung's daughter.
 Go Kyung-min as Shin Min-gi, Hye-ryung's son.
 Yoon Hye-bin as Joo No-eul, Kyung-il's daughter.
 Kim Min-cheol as Jang Do-kyung, a mysterious college student who lives in a rented apartment next to the Royal State in Gangnam's 4th district.
 as Mrs. Jang
 Kim Seung-wook as Hwang Geun-young

Extended
 Kim Tae-hyang as Yu-ra's husband who is a famous plastic surgeon.

Special appearance
 Choi Soo-young as a top star.

Production
The first script reading of the cast was held in August 2021.

Viewership

References

External links
  
 
 

Korean-language television shows
TV Chosun television dramas
Television series by Monster Union
South Korean television series based on British television series
2021 South Korean television series debuts
2022 South Korean television series endings
Wavve original programming